Patrick Brosnan is an American mathematician, known for his work on motives, Hodge theory, and algebraic groups. He received his Ph.D. from the University of Chicago in 1998 under the direction of Spencer Bloch.  Brosnan is the 2009 recipient of the Coxeter–James Prize of the Canadian Mathematical Society.

In 2003, Brosnan (in joint work with Prakash Belkale) disproved the Spanning Tree Conjecture of Maxim Kontsevich.

Notes

External links 

University of Chicago alumni
1968 births
Living people
University of Maryland, College Park faculty
Academic staff of the University of British Columbia
20th-century American mathematicians
21st-century American mathematicians
21st-century Canadian mathematicians
Scientists from British Columbia
20th-century Canadian mathematicians
Mathematicians from Philadelphia